Roberto García Ruiz (born 5 March 1974) is a Spanish actor best known for the role of Oslo in Money Heist.

García Ruiz is a former bodybuilder.

Selected filmography
 2017-2020 : Money Heist (La Casa de Papel) (TV Series) : Dimitri Mostóvoi / Radko « Oslo » Dragić
 2022 : In From the Cold (TV Series) : Tiago Vento
 2022 : Sayen by Alexander Witt

References

External links 

1974 births
Living people
Spanish male film actors